"Mama" is a song by South Korean-Chinese boy bands Exo-K and Exo-M. It served as their debut single and the title track of their debut extended play Mama (2012). Available in both Korean and Mandarin, the song was released digitally on April 8, 2012, by SM Entertainment.

Release and promotion
"Mama" was written by Yoo Young-jin and produced by Yoo Young-jin. The Korean version is performed by subgroup Exo-K and the Mandarin version by Exo-M. The music videos of the song were released on YouTube on April 7, 2012, the same day the song was made available for download through iTunes and other Korean and mainland Chinese online retailers.

Exo-K and Exo-M performed both versions during their pre-debut showcase on March 31, 2012 in Seoul, South Korea, followed by a second group performance for their second showcase in Beijing, China on April 1.

On April 7, Exo-M made their television debut at China's 12th Yinyue Fengyun Bang Awards, performing "Mama". On that same day Exo-K made their debut in Korea on SBS's music program The Music Trend, performing both "Mama" and a prologue single, "History". Exo-K also debuted on Mnet's M! Countdown on April 12, KBS's Music Bank on April 13, and MBC's Show! Music Core on April 14.

Music video
Two music videos for "Mama" were released on YouTube on April 8, 2012 through S.M. Entertainment's official channel, SMTOWN. Each music video, though recorded in two different versions, featured all twelve members of Exo.

The two videos begin with the same animation and English voice over illustrating the birth of twelve legendary powers that break into two separate forces in order to "keep alive the heart of the tree of life," which is being conquered by an evil force. The two legends divide the tree of life in half, and carries each piece to their own lands. The narration then declares that the two legends will "reunite into one perfect root" on the day, the evil force purifies. After the introduction, all twelve members of Exo appear wearing robes as they walk to the center of a darkly lit circular room. The song begins with a Gregorian chant, and the members look up to a bright light in the sky in unison. Throughout the videos, there are close-up shots of the members performing their own celestial powers with intercut sequences of choreographed dancing, choreographed by Lyle Beniga. Xiumin has cyrokinesis (frost), Kris has flying, Luhan has telekinesis, Suho has water powers, Baekhyun has light powers, Lay has healing, Chen has lightning, Chanyeol has pyrokinesis, D.O. has strength and ground manipulation, Tao has time stopping, Kai has teleportation, and Sehun has wind. The videos end with each group finishing their dance, and they both close with the logo of Exo. The song uses a riff from Led Zeppelin's "Kashmir" in the background as well as the end of Guns N' Roses' "November Rain".

Charts

Sales

References

Exo songs
2012 singles
SM Entertainment singles
Korean songs
Korean-language songs
Chinese songs
Mandarin-language songs
Songs written by Yoo Young-jin
2011 songs